SM Town Week (stylized as SMTOWN WEEK) is a winter music festival held from December 21 to 29, 2013 at the Korea International Exhibition Center in South Korea. The show features performances from various SM Entertainment artists.

Performers 
TVXQ
Super Junior
Girls' Generation
SHINee
f(x)
EXO

The Wizard 
The Wizard was the first concert tour of SMTOWN Week headlined by South Korean boy group, SHINee. The concert was held on December 21, 2013.

Set list 

 "Hitchhiking"
 "Nightmare"
 "Dream Girl"
 "Sherlock"
 "Dang Dang Dang" (Jonghyun and Key cover)
 "How Dare Do You Pour a Oil or Something" (Minho cover)
 "Cry For Me" (Taemin cover)
 "In Your Eyes" (Onew cover)
 "Billie Jean" (Minho cover)
 "Macarena" (Onew and Minho cover)
 "Sleepless Night" (Acoustic version)
 "Honesty"
 "In My Room (Unplugged remix)
 "Run With Me"
 "Dazzling Girl"
 "Get It + Get Down"
 "Up & Down"
 "Ready Or Not"
 "Lucifer" (Remix)
 "Beautiful" (Remix)
 "X-Mas"
 "Bodyguard"
 "Magic Castle"
 "Everybody"
 "Green Rain"
 "Colorful"
 "Selene 6.23"

Märchen Fantasy 
Märchen Fantasy was the second concert tour of SMTOWN Week headlined by South Korean girl group, Girls' Generation. The concert was held on December 22, 2013.

Set list 

 "The Boys"
 "Hoot"
 "Express 999"
 "Galaxy Supernova"
 "Love & Girls"
 "Romantic St."
 "Love Melody"
 "Over the Rainbow" (Taeyeon, Sunny, Tiffany, and Yuri cover)
 "When You Wish Upon a Star" (Jessica, Hyoyeon, Sooyoung, Yoona and Seohyun cover)
 "A Whole New World" (Tiffany with SHINee's Onew cover)
 "Grown-Up Christmas List" (Taeyeon cover)
 "Kiss Me" (Seohyun cover)
 "Ma Boy" (Tiffany and Yuri cover)
 "Bloom" (Sunny cover)
 "24 Hours" (Sooyoung cover)
 "Miss Korea" (Jessica cover)
 "Honey"
 "Kissing You" (Christmas remix)
 "Gee" (Acapella version)
 "Santa Baby"
 "Diamond"
 "All I Want for Christmas Is You" (Girls' Generation cover)
  "Magic Castle"
 "I Got a Boy"
 "Snowy Wish"

Shows

Christmas Wonderland 
{{hidden|headercss=background:#FFE1E8; font-size:100%; width:75%;|contentcss=text-align:left; font-size:100%; width:75%;|header=f(x) and EXO, Christmas Wonderland (December 24-25, 2013)|content=Main Set
 
  "NU ABO"
  "Airplane"
  "LA chA TA"

  "Let Out The Beast"
  "Black Pearl"
  "History"
  "No More"
  "Step"
  "Jet"
  "Peter Pan"
  "3.6.5"
  "Lucky"

  "Have Yourself a Merry Little Christmas" (Luna and Chen cover)
  "First Snow"
  "Christmas Day"

  "Rockin' Around The X-Mas Tree" (f(x) cover)
  "Baby Don't Cry"
  "Thrift Shop" (Amber and Kris cover)
  "Miracles in December
  "Goodbye Summer"
  "Candy" + "Happiness" (EXO cover)

  "Pinocchio (Danger)"
  "Electric Shock"
  "Wolf"
  "Mama"

  "Rum Pum Pum Pum"
  "Growl"
  "Jingle Bell Rock"  (f(x) and EXO cover)}}

Time Slip 
{{hidden|headercss=background:#f73645; font-size:100%; width:75%;|contentcss=text-align:left; font-size:100%; width:75%;|header=TVXQ, Time Slip (December 26-27, 2013)|content=Main Set
 
  "Maximum"
  "I Don't Know"
  "Here I Stand"
  "Dream"

  "Jesu, Joy of Man's Desiring" (TVXQ cover)
  "Silent Night" (TVXQ cover)
 <li value="7"> "Sleigh Ride" (TVXQ cover)
 <li value="8"> "My Little Princess"
 <li value="9"> "I Believe"
 <li value="10"> "Always With You"
 <li value="11"> "Balloons"

 <li value="12"> "Keep Your Head Down"
 <li value="13"> "Rising Sun"
 <li value="14"> "Catch Me"

 <li value="15"> "Unforgettable"
 <li value="16"> "Always There..."
 <li value="17"> "How Are You?"
 <li value="18"> "Santa Revolution" (Sung by U-Know Yunho)
 <li value="19"> "Wild Horse" (Sung by Max Changmin)

 <li value="20"> "We are!"
 <li value="21"> "Ocean"
 <li value="22"> "Somebody To Love"
 <li value="23"> "Magic Castle"

 <li value="24"> "Hug"
 <li value="25"> "Thanks To"}}

Treasure Island

Shows

References 

SM Town concert tours
2013 concert tours
K-pop concerts
SM Town
SM Entertainment